The Fender Electric XII is a purpose-built 12-string electric guitar, designed for folk rockers. Instead of using a Stratocaster-body style, it uses one similar to a Jaguar/Jazzmaster body style. It also departed from the typical "Stratocaster"-style headstock, instead featuring a long headstock nicknamed the "hockey-stick" headstock to cope with the twelve tuners. The original Electric XII employed a unique split pickup design and had a 4-way pickup rotary selector allowing for neck, neck & bridge in parallel, in or out of phase, and bridge only options as opposed to the Alternate Reality version which sports a standard 3-way toggle switch for pickup selection. It also used a string-through-body design similar to a Telecaster to help increase sustain.

Designed by Leo Fender, the Fender Electric XII was introduced in late 1965 with the bulk of the production taking place in 1966 before it was discontinued around 1970. Unlike its competitors' electric 12-string models which were simply existing 6-string guitars with six extra strings, the Fender Electric XII was a purpose-built 12-string designed to capture a part of the folk-rock market. The bridge has an individual saddle for each string making precise intonation possible. The Electric XII was not particularly popular during its run, and by 1969, it was dropped from the Fender line before being reintroduced as a part of the Alternate Reality series in 2019. The body overstock was used for the Fender Custom ( Fender Maverick).

Notable players 
 Pete Townshend, who used it extensively on the album Tommy.
 Tim Buckley.
 Jimmy Page, who used it for the studio recording of Led Zeppelin's famous "Stairway to Heaven" and on Jeff Beck's "Beck's Bolero".
 Gene Clark of The Byrds was seen using one on a May 1965 television appearance.
 Eric Clapton used it for the recording of "Dance the Night Away" with the band Cream in 1967.
 Lou Reed and Sterling Morrison purchased matching Fender XIIs before the sessions for the Velvet Underground's eponymous third album in 1968.
 Johnny Winter also used one briefly (strung as a regular six-string) during the late 1960s and early 1970s.
 Pye Hastings used one during the early days of Caravan, notably on their album For Girls Who Grow Plump In The Night in 1973.
 Gustavo Cerati of Soda Stereo played and recorded with a Fender XII between 1988 and 1990, notably seen in the videos of "En la ciudad de la furia" and "de Música ligera".
 Chad Taylor of Live prominently used a lake placid blue Fender XII both on stage and in the studio, most notably to write and record the single "Run to the Water", as well as several other tracks on the band's platinum album The Distance to Here.
 Krist Novoselic of Nirvana also played the Fender XII while he was in Sweet 75.
 The Verve guitarist Nick McCabe used a Fender Electric XII for live performances on the band's 2008 comeback tour, notably on 'Space and Time' from their 1997 album Urban Hymns.
 Tom Petty used a white Fender XII for the first half of his 2006 North American Tour instead of his signature Rickenbacker 12-string
 John Paisano, the "official" guitarist of Herb Alpert and the Tijuana Brass used the Fender Electric XII extensively; it is heard in the intro of their recording of "Wade in the Water".
 The guitar is also seen played by Steve Bartek on the Oingo Boingo Farewell DVD/video.
 Jason Mozersky of Relentless7 also uses an Electric XII.
 Mike Einziger, guitarist of Californian band Incubus, used an Electric 12 for the intro of the song "Love Hurts" off the band's 2008 album, "Light Grenades".
 Roy Wood, guitarist of The Move, used an Electric 12 in the song "Blackberry Way".
 Thurston Moore received one as a gift for his 60th birthday and used it in the recording of By the Fire.

See also 
 Fender Custom (a.k.a. Fender Maverick) – guitar made of overstock XII bodies
 Fender Stratocaster XII
 Fender Telecaster XII

References

Sources

External links 
 Fender Electric XII

Electric XII
1965 musical instruments
Musical instruments invented in the 1960s